The District of Maine was the governmental designation for what is now the U.S. state of Maine from October 25, 1780 to March 15, 1820, when it was admitted to the Union as the 23rd state. The district was a part of the Commonwealth of Massachusetts and before American independence had been part of the British province of Massachusetts Bay.

Colonial history

Originally settled in 1607 by the Plymouth Company, the coastal area between the Merrimack and Kennebec rivers, as well as an irregular parcel of land between the headwaters of the two rivers, became the province of Maine in a 1622 land grant. In 1629, the land was split, creating an area between the Piscataqua and Merrimack rivers which became the province of New Hampshire. It existed through a series of land patents made by the kings of England during this era, and included New Somersetshire, Lygonia, and Falmouth. The province was incorporated into the Massachusetts Bay Colony during the 1650s, beginning with the formation of York County, Massachusetts, which extended from the Piscataqua River to just east of the mouth of the Presumpscot River in Casco Bay. Eventually, its territory grew to encompass nearly all of present-day Maine. The large size of the county led to its division in 1760 through the creation of Cumberland and Lincoln counties.

The northeastern portion of present-day Maine was first sparsely occupied by Maliseet Indians and French settlers from Acadia. The lands between the Kennebec and Saint Croix rivers were granted to the Duke of York in 1664, who had them administered as Cornwall County, part of his proprietary Province of New York. In 1688, these lands (along with the rest of New York) were subsumed into the Dominion of New England. English and French claims in western Maine would be contested, at times violently, until the British conquest of New France in the French and Indian War. With the creation of the Province of Massachusetts Bay in 1692, the entirety of what is now Maine became part of that province.

District history
When Massachusetts adopted its state constitution in 1780, it created the District of Maine to manage its northernmost counties, bounded on the west by the Piscataqua River and on the east by the Saint Croix River. By 1820, the District had been further subdivided with the creation of Hancock, Kennebec, Oxford, Penobscot, Somerset, and Washington counties.

A movement for Maine statehood began as early as 1785, and in the following years, several conventions were held to effect this. Starting in 1792 five popular votes were taken but all failed to reach the necessary majorities. During the War of 1812,  British and Canadian forces occupied a large portion of Maine including everything from the Penobscot River east to the New Brunswick border with the goal of annexing them to Canada as the Colony of New Ireland. A weak response by Massachusetts to this occupation and possible British annexation contributed to increased calls in the district for statehood.

Statehood
The Massachusetts General Court passed enabling legislation on June 19, 1819, separating the District of Maine from the rest of the Commonwealth. The following month, on July 19, voters in the district approved statehood by 17,091 to 7,132.

The results of the election were presented to the Massachusetts Governor's Council on August 24, 1819. The Maine Constitution was unanimously approved by the 210 delegates to the Maine Constitutional Convention in October 1819. On February 25, 1820, the General Court passed a follow-up measure officially accepting the fact of Maine's imminent statehood.

At the time of Maine’s request for statehood, there were an equal number of free and slave states. Pro-slavery members of the United States Congress saw the admission of another free state, Maine, as a threat to the balance between slave and free states. They would support statehood for Maine only if Missouri Territory, where slavery was legal, would be admitted to the Union as a slave state. Maine became the nation's 23rd state on March 15, 1820, following the Missouri Compromise, which allowed Missouri to enter the Union as a slave-holding state and Maine as a free state.

References

External links
 Willis, William, History of Portland, 1865. (Ch. 24: Separation of Maine from Massachusetts)

Former regions and territories of the United States
District of Maine
History of Massachusetts
District of Maine
District of Maine
District of Maine
States and territories established in 1780
States and territories disestablished in 1820
Exclaves in the United States
Former exclaves
1780 establishments in Massachusetts
18th century in Maine
19th century in Maine
1820 disestablishments in Maine
1820 disestablishments in Massachusetts